The western long-beaked echidna (Zaglossus bruijnii) is one of the four extant echidnas and one of three species of Zaglossus that occurs in New Guinea. Originally described as Tachyglossus bruijnii, this is the type species of Zaglossus.

Description 
The western long-beaked echidna is an egg-laying mammal. Unlike the short-beaked echidna, which eats ants and termites, the long-beaked species eats earthworms. It is distinguished from the other Zaglossus species by the number of claws on the fore and hind feet: three (rarely four). It is the largest extant monotreme.

Distribution and habitat 
Its preferred habitats are alpine meadow and humid montane forests.

Kimberley specimen 

The Tring Collection of the British Museum of Natural History includes a western long-beaked echidna, with a collection label noting its collection by John T. Tunney in 1901. Curiously, the location of collection is noted as Mount Anderson, in the Kimberley region of north-west Australia. However, this species is otherwise thought to be extinct for millennia in Australia; the only other specimens of Zaglossus from Australia are fossils dated to the Pleistocene period.

It was presumed that the specimen was in fact collected from elsewhere and inadvertently attached to a Tunney collection label. Thus, the specimen received no further attention for many years.

A study by Helgen et al. (2012) examined the specimen and considered various aspects including the circumstantial improbability of a collection label misassignment, the uniqueness of ectoparasites found on the specimen, the similarity of some Kimberly forests to known habitat in New Guinea, an indigenous cave painting appearing to depict a long-beaked echidna, and the testimony of an Aboriginal elder. The study concludes that the specimen likely was collected in Australia as stated on the label. The researchers argue that the species ought to be recognised in the state's fauna as persisting into the modern era, and could potentially still be extant in poorly surveyed forests of north-western Australia; if locally extinct, reintroduction of this critically endangered species would be worth consideration.

Burbidge (2017) disputes this conclusion, arguing against each line of evidence, and concluding that the specimen is likely from New Guinea but assigned an incorrect label.

Conservation 
The species is listed as Critically Endangered by the IUCN; numbers have decreased due to human activities including habitat loss and hunting. The long-beaked echidna is considered a delicacy, and although commercial hunting of the species has been banned by the Indonesian and Papua New Guinean governments, traditional hunting is permitted. In January 2013, an expedition led by Conservation International reported finding a population of the mammals as part of what they described as a "lost world" of wildlife in the Foja Mountains of Papua Province, Indonesia.

References

Further reading 

 Augee, M and Gooden, B. 1993. Echidnas of Australia and New Guinea. Australian National History Press 
 

Monotremes of New Guinea
Endemic fauna of New Guinea
Mammals of Western New Guinea
Critically endangered fauna of Oceania
Mammals described in 1876
Taxa named by Wilhelm Peters
Taxa named by Giacomo Doria